The following Confederate Army units and commanders fought in the Camden Expedition of the American Civil War. Order of battle compiled from the army organization during the campaign. The Union order of battle is listed separately.

Abbreviations used

Military rank
 Gen = General
 MG = Major General
 BG = Brigadier General
 Col = Colonel
 Ltc = Lieutenant Colonel
 Maj = Major
 Cpt = Captain
 Lt = 1st Lieutenant

Other
 k = killed
 w = wounded

Confederate forces

Gen E. Kirby Smith, Commanding

District of Arkansas
MG Sterling Price

Escort:
 14th Missouri Battalion

See also

 List of Arkansas Civil War Confederate units
 Lists of American Civil War Regiments by State
 Confederate Units by State
 Arkansas in the American Civil War
 Arkansas Militia in the Civil War

Notes

References
 Forsyth, Michael J. The Camden Expedition of 1864 and the Opportunity Lost by the Confederacy to Change the Civil War (Jefferson, NC: McFarland & Company, Inc., Publishers), 2003. .
 U.S. War Department, The War of the Rebellion: a Compilation of the Official Records of the Union and Confederate Armies. Series 1, Vol. XXXIV, Part 1, Washington, DC: U.S. Government Printing Office, 1880–1901.

American Civil War orders of battle
Arkansas in the American Civil War
1863 in Arkansas
Military units and formations in Arkansas
Military in Arkansas